A solar power station is a power station in which solar energy is converted to electric power. A solar power station may be referred to as any of the following types:

 List of photovoltaic power stations
 List of solar thermal power stations